A list of films produced by the Marathi language film industry based in Maharashtra in the year 1963.

1963 Releases
A list of Marathi films released in 1963.

References

Lists of 1963 films by country or language
 Marathi
1963